Hans Gilgen (16 September 1906 – 20 September 1980) was a Swiss racing cyclist. He competed in the team pursuit event at the 1928 Summer Olympics. He was also the Swiss National Road Race champion in 1934.

References

External links
 

1906 births
1980 deaths
People from Bern-Mittelland District
Swiss male cyclists
Olympic cyclists of Switzerland
Cyclists at the 1928 Summer Olympics
Sportspeople from the canton of Bern